Muhammad Bello was an Emir of Kano who reigned from 1883 to 1892.

Biography in the Kano Chronicle
Below is a biography of Muhammad Bello from Palmer's 1908 English translation of the Kano Chronicle.

References

Emirs of Kano
19th-century rulers in Africa